Dashun (大順) may refer to:

Shun dynasty (1644–1645), a short-lived state under Li Zicheng 
Dashun, Anhui, a town in Shou County, Anhui, China

Era names
Dashun (890–891), era name used by Emperor Zhaozong of Tang
Dashun (1644–1646), era name used by Zhang Xianzhong